Anaganaga Oka Ammai: Heartfully Yours is a 1999 Indian Telugu-language romantic drama film directed by Ramesh Sarangan and starring Srikanth and Soundarya. The film was a box office failure with the producer going into debt.

Cast 

Srikanth as Vishnu
Soundarya as Sandhya
Abbas as Satya
Poonam
Raghuvaran as Bhavani Prasad
Annapurna as Annapurna 
Chandramohan
Brahmanandam
M. S. Narayana
Ali
Rallapalli
Gautam Raju
Sivaji Raja
Sudha
Subbaraya Sharma
Bandla Ganesh
Surya

Soundtrack
Songs composed by Mani Sharma.
"Swathi Chinuka" – Udit Narayan, Sujatha
"Ulle Ulle Uyyalale" – S.P. Balasubrahmanyam
"Kakinada College" – S.P.Balasubrahmanyam
"Nena Nuvve Nena" – S.P. Balasubrahmanyam, Sujatha
"Too Much Too Much" – Devi Sri Prasad, chorus

Reception 
Jeevi of Idlebrain.com opined that "If you are going to watch this film, my recommendation for you is to know the two line story of first half and watch the second half on the big screen. You will enjoy it to the hilt".

Awards
Nandi Awards
Best Female Dubbing Artist - Shilpa (for Soundarya)

References

1990s Telugu-language films